HMS Severn was a  monitor of the Royal Navy. She had been christened Solimoes by the Brazilians, but was renamed by the British. The three ships were the first of a new type of specialized shore-bombardment warships. As a result of her shallow draught, she was very un-manoeuvrable and unseaworthy in open waters in anything more than a Force 5 wind.

Service history

Severn had a relatively successful career during the First World War with at least three engagements. At the Battle of the Yser in 1914, off the coast of Belgium, she bombarded German troops as well as artillery positions. On 10 October 1914, she survived an attack by the submarine  when a torpedo passed under the shallow draught vessel. In early 1915, the twin turret was removed and replaced by two shielded single 6 inch guns fore and aft. In July 1915, the monitor was towed to the Rufiji River delta in German East Africa where she and Mersey then assisted in the destruction of the German light cruiser . She continued to serve on the East Africa station until 1918 and after a long refit in Alexandria, also served on the lower Danube until March 1919.

She was sold for breaking up on 9 May 1921 to Thos. W. Ward, of Preston, and arrived at their yards on 23 March 1923.

References

Citations

References 
 
 
 Jane's Fighting Ships of World War One (1919), Jane's Publishing Company

 

Javary-class monitors
Ships built on the River Tyne
1913 ships
Humber-class monitors
World War I monitors of the United Kingdom